Ramchand Pakistani is a 2008 Urdu-language Pakistani drama film directed by Mehreen Jabbar and produced by Javed Jabbar. 

The film features Nandita Das, Rashid Farooqi, Syed Fazel Hussain, Maria Wasti and Noman Ijaz in lead roles. The film is based on a true story of a boy who inadvertently crosses the border between Pakistan and India and the following ordeal that his family has to go through. Ramchand Pakistani was also released in India.

Plot
Champa (Nandita Das) is a Hindu woman who is left desolate when her young son and husband disappear one day from their village at the India-Pakistan border near Nagarparkar, in the Tharparkar district of the Sindh province. The film depicts the crossing of the India-Pakistan border, during a period (June 2002) of war-like tension between the two countries, by two members of a Pakistani Hindu family belonging to the 'untouchable' dalit caste, and the extraordinary consequences of this unintended action upon the lives of a woman, a man, and their son.

The film is about a Hindu Dalit family living in Pakistan peacefully. Ramchand, the main protagonist who is 8 years old, is the son of Shankar and Champa. One day, after an altercation with his mother, Ramchand runs away in anger and, accidentally, crosses the Indo-Pakistan border into India. His father follows him and, he too, crosses the border into India.

After being arrested by the border security personnel, they are sent to a prison in India and stay there for a long time. They get a release order soon, but later it turns out to be a mistake and they are sent back to the jail. Ramchand, the 8 years old boy, and his father Shankar are unregistered prisoners during much of their stay in India. Meanwhile, Ramchand’s mother, Champa, leads a life of loneliness and although she takes a temporary job in a faraway place, she returns to her village.

Finally, after 5 years, when Ramchand has grown a few years, he gets released. He returns home to his mother. His father, Shankar, also gets released soon after. They are united and there, the film ends.

Cast
 Nandita Das as Champa
 Syed Fazal Hussain as Younger Ramchand
 Navaid Jabbar as Older Ramchand
 Rashid Farooqui as  Shankar
 Maria Wasti as Kamla
 Nouman Ijaz as Abdullah
 Adnan Shah as Sharma
 Adarsh Ayaz as Moti
 Farooq Pario as Suresh
 Shahood Alvi as Asif Hussain
 Zhalay Sarhadi as Lakshmi
 Atif Badar as Lalu
 Saleem Mairaj as Vishesh
 Saif-e-Hasan as Murad
 Tahiirz as VKS
 Rao Saleem as  Interrogator
 Karim Bux Baloch as Baloch
 Master Yaqub as Baba Gul
 Hassan Niazi as Deepak
 Kazim Raza as Professor
 Muhammad Rafiq as Bengali
 Sajid Shah as Inspector
 Iqbal Motilani as Maulvi
 Anis Chachar as Captain Saleem

Film screenings overseas
This film had six screenings at the Museum of Modern Art in New York City in 2010.

Soundtrack
The soundtrack is composed by Debojyoti Mishra and include the following songs:

Awards
This film won the following awards:
FIPRESCI Prize from the International Federation of Film Critics at the Osian Film Festival, July, 2008
 Winner of Honourable Mention by the 13th Annual Satyajit Ray Award at the 2008 London Film Festival.
 Best Actor for Rashid Farooqi at the KaraFilm Festival, Pakistan, 2009
 Winner of Audience Award at the Fribourg International Film Festival, Switzerland, March 2009.
 Winner of Special Mention by the Eucumenical Jury at the Fribourg International Film Festival March 2009.
 Winner of Special Mention by the E-Changer Award at the Fribourg International Film Festival in March 2009
 Ramchand Pakistani received a silver medal in the feature film category at the 2012 SAARC Film Awards.
 Rashid Farooqui received the award for best actor in the feature film at the 2012 SAARC Film Awards.
 Ramchand Pakistani won Best Film Award on Pakistan Media Award in 2010.

Lux Style Awards

See also
 Gori temple, the site of Meri Maati song.
 Nagarparkar Bhodesar temple: the site of Tarrin Paunda song.

References

External links
 
 Movie Review Ramchand Pakistani (2008)

2008 films
Films scored by Debojyoti Mishra
Pakistani drama films
2000s Urdu-language films
Urdu-language Pakistani films
Lollywood films
Films set in Sindh
Films shot in Sindh
Films shot in Pakistan
Mehreen Jabbar's directions
Films based on actual events
Films about social class
India–Pakistan relations in popular culture